Anderton is a surname. Notable people with the surname include:

 Alain Anderton, British writer
 Bill Anderton (1891–1966), New Zealand politician
 Carl Anderton Jr. (born 1973), American politician
 Charles Anderton (disambiguation), multiple people
 Darren Anderton (born 1972), English footballer
 Elizabeth Anderton (born 1934), British ballet dancer
 Henry Anderton (1630–1667), English painter
 James Anderton (disambiguation), multiple people
 Jim Anderton (1938–2018), New Zealand politician
 Jo Anderton, Australian writer
 John Anderton (disambiguation), multiple people
 Katie Anderton (born 1983), English footballer
 Laurence Anderton (1577–1643), English Jesuit
 Maria Anderton (born 1969), New Zealand footballer
 Michael Anderton (1931–2020), English clergyman and cricketer
 Nick Anderton (born 1996), English footballer
 Paul Anderton (born 1962), Australian bodybuilder
 Phil Anderton, Scottish business executive
 Sophie Anderton (born 1977), English model and reality television personality
 Syl Anderton (1907–1983), British motorcycle dealer and racer
 Sylvan Anderton (born 1934), English footballer
 Thomas Anderton (1611–1671), historical religious figure
 Venerable Robert Anderton (died 1586), Catholic martyr
 William Anderton (born 1879), English footballer